Papradište may refer to:
 Papradište, Čaška, North Macedonia
 Papradište, Kičevo, North Macedonia